Bella Savitzky Abzug (July 24, 1920 – March 31, 1998), nicknamed "Battling Bella", was an American lawyer, politician, social activist, and a leader in the women's movement. In 1971, Abzug joined other leading feminists such as Gloria Steinem, Shirley Chisholm, and Betty Friedan to found the National Women's Political Caucus. She was a leading figure in what came to be known as eco-feminism.

In 1970, Abzug's first campaign slogan was, "This woman's place is in the House—the House of Representatives." She was later appointed to co-chair the National Commission on the Observance of International Women's Year created by President Gerald Ford's executive order, presided over the 1977 National Women's Conference, and led President Jimmy Carter's National Advisory Commission for Women. Abzug was a founder of the Commission for Women’s Equality of the American Jewish Congress.

Early life
Bella Savitzky was born on July 24, 1920, in New York City. Both of her parents were Russian Jewish immigrants. Her mother, Esther (née Tanklefsky), was a homemaker, and her father, Emanuel Savitzky, ran the Live and Let Live Meat Market on Ninth Avenue. Even in her youth, she was competitive and would beat other children in all sorts of competitions. She ran the cash register at her father's deli as a young girl.

Her religious upbringing influenced her development into a feminist. According to Abzug, "It was during these visits to the synagogue that I think I had my first thoughts as a feminist rebel. I didn't like the fact that women were consigned to the back rows of the balcony." When her father died, Abzug, then 13, was told that her Orthodox synagogue did not permit women to say the (mourners') Kaddish, since that rite was reserved for sons of the deceased. However, because her father had no sons, she went to the synagogue every morning for a year to recite the prayer, defying the tradition of her congregation's practice of Orthodox Judaism.

Abzug graduated from Walton High School in The Bronx, where she was class president. Through high school she took violin lessons and went to Florence Marshall Hebrew High School after classes at Walton. She went on to major in political science at Hunter College of the City University of New York and simultaneously attended the Jewish Theological Seminary of America. At Hunter College, she was student council president and active in the American Student Union. Abzug first met Mim Kelber, who would go on to co-found WEDO with her, at Walton High School and they went on to attend Hunter College with one another. She later earned a law degree from Columbia University in 1944.

Legal and political career
Abzug was admitted to the New York Bar in 1945, at a time when very few women practiced law, and started her career in New York City at the firm of Pressman, Witt & Cammer, frequently working cases in matters of labor law.

As a lawyer, she specialized in labor rights, tenants' rights, and civil liberties cases. Early on, she took on civil rights cases in the South. She appealed the case of Willie McGee, a black man convicted in 1945 of raping a white woman in Laurel, Mississippi, and sentenced to death by an all-white jury who deliberated for only two-and-a-half minutes. Abzug lost the appeal and the man was executed. Abzug was an outspoken advocate of liberal causes, including the Equal Rights Amendment, and opposition to the Vietnam War as well as the military draft. She worked for the American Civil Liberties Union and the Civil Rights Congress.

Years before she was elected to the House of Representatives, she was an early participant in Women Strike for Peace. Her political stance placed her on the master list of Nixon political opponents. During the McCarthy era, she was one of the few legal attorneys willing to openly combat the House Un-American Activities Committee.

Congressional career

Elections
Nicknamed "Battling Bella", in 1970 she challenged the 14-year incumbent Leonard Farbstein in the Democratic primary for a congressional district on Manhattan's West Side. She defeated Farbstein in a considerable upset and then defeated talk show host Barry Farber in the general election. In 1972, her district was eliminated via redistricting and she chose to run against William Fitts Ryan, who also represented part of the West Side, in the Democratic primary. Ryan, although seriously ill, defeated Abzug. However, Ryan died before the general election and Abzug defeated his widow, Priscilla, at the party's convention to choose the new Democratic nominee. In the general election Priscilla Ryan challenged Abzug on the Liberal Party line, but was unsuccessful. She was reelected easily in 1974. For her last two terms, she represented part of The Bronx as well.

Tenure
She was one of the first members of Congress to support gay rights, introducing the first federal gay rights bill, known as the Equality Act of 1974, with fellow Democratic New York City representative, Ed Koch, a future mayor of New York City. She also chaired historic hearings on government secrecy, being the chair for the Subcommittee on Government Information and Individual Rights. She was voted by her colleagues as the third most influential member of the House as reported in U.S. News & World Report.

She was the sponsor for the Equality Credit Opportunity Act (ECOA) that made it unlawful to discriminate against any applicant, with respect to any aspect of a credit transaction, on the basis of race, color, religion, national origin, sex, marital status, or age.

She was frequently verbally abusive toward staff members, including referring to Doug Ireland as a "fat cocksucker."

Although they were banned on the House floor, Abzug was known for her colorful and vibrant hats, and was seldom seen without one. After being forced to remove her iconic hat before entering the House floor, Abzug once remarked that she felt "naked and unrecognizable." She famously reminded all who admired them: "It's what's under the hat that counts!"

In February 1975, Abzug was part of a bipartisan delegation sent to Saigon by President Gerald Ford to assess the situation on the ground in South Vietnam near the end of the Vietnam War.

Abzug was a supporter of Zionism. As a young woman she was a member of the Socialist-Zionist youth movement of HaShomer HaTzair. In 1975 she challenged the United Nations General Assembly Resolution 3379 (revoked in 1991 by resolution 46/86), which "determine[d] that Zionism is a form of racism and racial discrimination." Abzug said about the topic, "Zionism is a liberation movement."

Campaign for U.S. Senate

Abzug's career in Congress ended with an unsuccessful bid for the Democratic nomination for the US Senate in 1976, which she lost by less than one percent to the more moderate Daniel Patrick Moynihan, who had served in both the Nixon and Ford Administrations as White House Urban Affairs Advisor, Counselor to the President, United States Ambassador to India, and United States Ambassador to the United Nations. Moynihan would go on to serve four terms in that office.

Later life and death
Abzug never held elected office again after leaving the House, although she remained a high-profile figure and was again a candidate on multiple occasions. She was unsuccessful in her bid to be mayor of New York City in 1977, as well as in attempts to return to the US House from the East Side of Manhattan in 1978 against Republican Bill Green, and from Westchester County, New York, in 1986 against Joe DioGuardi.

She authored two books, Bella: Ms. Abzug Goes to Washington and The Gender Gap, the latter co-authored with friend and colleague Mim Kelber.

In early 1977, President Jimmy Carter chose a new National Commission on the Observance of International Women's Year and appointed Abzug to head it. Numerous events were held over the next two years, culminating in the 1977 National Women's Conference in November. She would continue this work as one of the two co-chairpersons for the National Advisory Committee for Women until her dismissal in January 1979, which would create a flash point of tension between the Carter administration and feminist organizations in the United States.

Abzug founded and ran several women's advocacy organizations. She founded a grassroots organization called Women USA, and continued to lead feminist advocacy events, for example serving as grand marshal of the Women's Equality Day New York March on August 26, 1980.

In the last decade of her life, in the early 1990s, with Kelber, she co-founded the Women's Environment and Development Organization (WEDO), in their own words "a global women's advocacy organization working towards a just world that promotes and protects human rights, gender equality, and the integrity of the environment." In 1991, WEDO held the World Women's Congress for a Healthy Planet in Miami, where 1,500 women from 83 countries produced the Women's Action Agenda 21.

At the UN, Abzug developed the Women's Caucus, which analyzed documents, proposed gender-sensitive policies and language, and lobbied to advance the Women's Agenda for the 21st Century at the 1992 UN Conference on Environment and Development in Rio de Janeiro, as well as women's issues at other events including the Fourth World Conference on Women in Beijing in 1995.

During her last years, Bella kept up her busy schedule of travel and work, even though she traveled in a wheelchair. Bella led WEDO until her death, giving her final public speech before the UN in March 1998.

After battling breast cancer for a number of years, she developed heart disease and died at Columbia-Presbyterian Medical Center on March 31, 1998, from complications following open heart surgery. She was 77. Abzug was interred at Old Mount Carmel Cemetery, Glendale, Queens County, New York.

Personal life
In 1944, Bella married Martin Abzug, a novelist and stockbroker. They met on a bus in Miami, Florida while heading to a Yehudi Menuhin concert, and they remained married until his death in 1986. They had two daughters.

Abzug was a cousin of Arlene Stringer-Cuevas and her son Scott Stringer, who were also involved in politics in New York City.

Abzug used to comment that if other male lawmakers were going to swim naked in the Congressional swimming pool as was the tradition, that that would be fine with her.

Honors and legacy
In 1991, Abzug received the "Maggie" Award, the highest honor of the Planned Parenthood Federation, in tribute to their founder, Margaret Sanger.

In 1994, Abzug was inducted into the National Women's Hall of Fame in Seneca Falls. The same year, she received a medal from the Veteran Feminists of America.

Abzug was honored on March 6, 1997, at the United Nations as a leading female environmentalist. She received the highest civilian recognition and honor at the U.N., the Blue Beret Peacekeepers Award. 

In 2004, her daughter Liz Abzug, an adjunct Urban Studies Professor at Barnard College and a political consultant, founded the Bella Abzug Leadership Institute (BALI) to mentor and train high school and college women to become effective leaders in civic, political, corporate and community life. To commemorate the thirtieth anniversary of the first National Women's Conference held in Houston in 1977, over which Bella Abzug had presided, BALI hosted a National Women's Conference on the weekend of November 10–11, 2007, at Hunter College (NYC). Over 600 people from around the world attended. Besides celebrating the 1977 Conference, the 2007 agenda was to address significant women's issues for the 21st century.

In 2017, Time magazine named Abzug one of its 50 Women Who Made American Political History.

Various landmarks in New York City bear Abzug's name. On March 1, 2019, the recently built Hudson Yards Park was renamed Bella Abzug Park as a tribute to women's history month and its location in her former Congressional district. In New York City's Greenwich Village, a portion of Bank Street is named for Abzug.

In popular culture 
She appeared in the WLIW video A Laugh, A Tear, A Mitzvah, as well as in Woody Allen's Manhattan (as herself), a 1977 episode of Saturday Night Live, and the documentary New York: A Documentary Film.

She appeared as herself in Manhattan (1979) at a real function that was shot by the film. In 1979, the Supersisters trading card set was produced and distributed; one of the cards featured Abzug's name and picture.

Abzug appeared in Shirley MacLaine's autobiographical book Out on a Limb (1983). In the 1987 ABC Television mini-series of the same name, Abzug was played by Anne Jackson.

In 2019 Manhattan Theater Club, in New York City, produced Bella Bella, a one-character show written and performed by Harvey Fierstein. In the show, Fierstein portrayed Abzug and created dialogue "from the words of Bella Abzug."

In the 2020 FX limited series, Mrs. America, Margo Martindale portrays Abzug. The program examines the unsuccessful multi-year battle to ratify the Equal Rights Amendment. That same year, Bette Midler portrayed Abzug in the film The Glorias.

Abzug was featured in a segment in the 2007 documentary NY77: The Coolest Year In Hell, which explores in depth what life was like during the year 1977 in Manhattan. An excerpt from a press conference of Bella Abzug is used when discussing the differences in political views between Abzug and fellow mayoral candidate Ed Koch. Geraldo Rivera gave detailed commentary on Bella's personality and political style.

Jeff L. Lieberman is producing a documentary film entitled Bella! about Abzug's life and political achievements. The film includes interviews with Barbra Streisand, Shirley MacLaine, Hillary Clinton, Lily Tomlin, Nancy Pelosi, Gloria Steinem, Maxine Waters, Phil Donahue, Marlo Thomas, Charles Rangel, David Dinkins and Renée Taylor. It is, as of January 2021, in post-production.

Selected bibliography

Books

Papers 
  Link.

See also 

 Women's Equality Day
 List of Jewish feminists
 List of Jewish members of the United States Congress
 Women in the United States House of Representatives

References

Further reading
 Levy, Alan H. (2013) The Political Life of Bella Abzug, 1920–1976: Political Passions, Women's Rights, and Congressional Battles (2013), excerpt and text search; coverage to 1976
 Levy, Alan H. The Political Life of Bella Abzug, 1976–1998: Electoral Failures and the Vagaries of Identity Politics (Lexington Books, 2013)
 Mahler, Jonathan (2005). Ladies and gentlemen, the Bronx is burning: 1977, baseball, politics, and the battle for the soul of a city. New York: Farrar, Straus and Giroux. .

External links

 
 Bella!, 2020 Documentary Feature Film
 About Bella Abzug (on the website of the Bella Abzug Leadership Institute)
 Blanche Wiesen Cook, an entry about Bella Abzug from the Jewish Women's Archive
 
 
 
 FBI file on Bella S. Abzug at the Internet Archive
 Bella Abzug at the National Women's Hall of Fame

|-

1920 births
1998 deaths
20th-century American lawyers
20th-century American politicians
20th-century American women politicians
American feminists
American pacifists
American people of Russian-Jewish descent
American abortion-rights activists
American women's rights activists
American Zionists
Burials in New York (state)
Columbia Law School alumni
Democratic Party members of the United States House of Representatives from New York (state)
Female members of the United States House of Representatives
Hunter College alumni
Jewish members of the United States House of Representatives
Jewish women politicians
Jewish Theological Seminary of America people
Lawyers from New York City
American LGBT rights activists
People from the Upper East Side
Politicians from the Bronx
Politicians from Manhattan
Women in New York (state) politics
Writers from Manhattan
Jewish American people in New York (state) politics
20th-century American women lawyers
Orthodox Jewish feminists
20th-century American Jews
Equal Rights Amendment activists
Candidates in the 1976 United States elections